Maxime Christophe Lestienne ((born 17 June 1992) is a Belgian professional footballer who plays as a winger for Singapore Premier League club Lion City Sailors. Lestienne is the league’s highest assister with over 20 assists.

Club career

Mouscron
Lestienne came up through the youth ranks at Royal Excelsior Mouscron. At the time of his debut in the senior squad on 20 December 2008, Mouscron was competing in the Belgian First Division. Lestienne came on as a substitute for Asanda Sishuba in the 80th minute of a 5–1 home victory against Club Brugge.

Club Brugge
After the bankruptcy of Mouscron in 2009, Lestienne became available on a free transfer.
Despite interest from English side Everton and Dutch side PSV, Lestienne eventually signed a contract with Club Brugge on 6 January 2010.

Al-Arabi
Lestienne was transferred to Al-Arabi in the summer of 2014.

Loan to Genoa
Lestienne was loaned out to Genoa until the end of the 2014–15 season almost immediately after signing for Qatari side Al-Arabi.

Loan to PSV
From 12 July 2015, Lestienne was loaned out to PSV until the end of the 2015–16 season. PSV decided not to exercise its option to buy the player at the end of the loan spell.

Rubin Kazan
On 5 July 2016, Lestienne moved to Russian club Rubin Kazan.

Málaga
On 31 January 2018, Lestienne joined Málaga on loan until the end of the 2017–18 season.

Standard Liège
On 25 July 2018, he returned to Belgium, signing with Standard Liège.

Lion City Sailors
On 8 February 2022, Lestienne joined Singapore-based club Lion City Sailors on a two-year deal. By matchweek 22, Lestienne had racked up 10 goals and 20 assists for the Sailors.

International career
Lestienne has appeared nine times for the Belgium U21 team and scored once, when he converted a penalty in the 53rd minute in a 2015 UEFA European Under-21 Football Championship qualification Group 9 game with Cyprus U21 won by Belgium 2–0.

He was called up to the Belgium national football team for the friendly against the United States in May 2013, but did not play. He was called up to the senior team again in 2019.

Career statistics

Club

References

External links
 
 Player info at walfoot.be 
 

1992 births
Living people
People from Mouscron
Belgian footballers
Footballers from Hainaut (province)
Association football forwards
Royal Excel Mouscron players
Club Brugge KV players
Genoa C.F.C. players
PSV Eindhoven players
Jong PSV players
FC Rubin Kazan players
Málaga CF players
Standard Liège players
Lion City Sailors FC players
Belgian Pro League players
Serie A players
Eredivisie players
Eerste Divisie players
Russian Premier League players
La Liga players
Belgium youth international footballers
Belgium under-21 international footballers
Belgian expatriate footballers
Belgian expatriate sportspeople in Italy
Expatriate footballers in Italy
Belgian expatriate sportspeople in the Netherlands
Expatriate footballers in the Netherlands
Belgian expatriate sportspeople in Qatar
Expatriate footballers in Qatar
Belgian expatriate sportspeople in Russia
Expatriate footballers in Russia
Belgian expatriate sportspeople in Spain
Expatriate footballers in Spain
Belgian expatriate sportspeople in Singapore
Expatriate footballers in Singapore